The 2022 Oldham Metropolitan Borough Council election took place on 5 May 2022. One third—20 out of 60—of councillors on Oldham Council was elected. The election took place alongside other local elections across the United Kingdom.

In the previous council election in 2021, the Labour Party maintained its control of the council, holding 40 of the council's 60 seats. The Conservative Party and the Liberal Democrats held eight seats each, and various independents held the remaining four.

Labour maintained their majority on the council, but lost five of their seats to a total of thirty-five members.

Background

History 

The Local Government Act 1972 created a two-tier system of metropolitan counties and districts covering Greater Manchester, Merseyside, South Yorkshire, Tyne and Wear, the West Midlands, and West Yorkshire starting in 1974. Oldham was a district of the Greater Manchester metropolitan county. The Local Government Act 1985 abolished the metropolitan counties, with metropolitan districts taking on most of their powers as metropolitan boroughs. The Greater Manchester Combined Authority was created in 2011 and began electing the mayor of Greater Manchester from 2017, which was given strategic powers covering a region coterminous with the former Greater Manchester metropolitan county.

Since its formation, Oldham Council has typically been under Labour control or no overall control, with a period of Conservative control from 1978–1980 and Liberal Democrat control from 2000–2002. Labour most recently gained overall control of the council in the 2011 election. The council leader Sean Fielding lost his seat to the Failsworth Independent Party in the most recent council election in 2021, in which Labour won nine of the twenty seats up for election, with the Conservatives winning five, the Liberal Democrats winning three and the Failsworth Independent Party winning two. Fielding had challenged the council's leader Jean Stretton in May 2018, demanding more street cleaners, landlord licensing, more housing in the city centre to reduce green belt development, and better connections to other areas of Greater Manchester.

Positions up for election in 2022 were last elected in 2018. In that election, 18 Labour councillors were elected, as were two Conservatives, and two Liberal Democrats.

Council term 
After Sean Fielding's defeat, the council's deputy leader Arooj Shah was elected leader. She promised to spend more on street cleaning and stronger enforcement against littering and fly tipping, as well as proposing ways to support local businesses.

The Conservative councillor Sahr Abid resigned in March 2022 citing work commitments, having been elected in 2021. A by-election will be held to fill her seat alongside the main council election.

Electoral process 
The council elects its councillors in thirds, with a third being up for election every year for three years, with no election in the fourth year. The election will take place by first-past-the-post voting, with wards generally being represented by three councillors, with one elected in each election year to serve a four-year term.

All registered electors (British, Irish, Commonwealth and European Union citizens) living in Oldham aged 18 or over will be entitled to vote in the election. People who live at two addresses in different councils, such as university students with different term-time and holiday addresses, are entitled to be registered for and vote in elections in both local authorities. Voting in-person at polling stations will take place from 07:00 to 22:00 on election day, and voters will be able to apply for postal votes or proxy votes in advance of the election.

Results summary

Ward results
The results are as follows:

Alexandra

Chadderton Central

Chadderton North

Chadderton South

Coldhurst

Crompton

Failsworth East

Failsworth West

Hollinwood

Medlock Vale

Royton North

Royton South

Saddleworth North

Saddleworth South

Saddleworth West & Lees

Shaw

St James

St Mary's

Waterhead

Werneth

References

Oldham Council elections
Oldham